Boris Lukomsky (born 6 June 1951) is a Soviet fencer. He won a bronze medal in the team épée event at the 1980 Summer Olympics.

References

1951 births
Living people
Russian male fencers
Soviet male fencers
Olympic fencers of the Soviet Union
Fencers at the 1976 Summer Olympics
Fencers at the 1980 Summer Olympics
Olympic bronze medalists for the Soviet Union
Olympic medalists in fencing
Sportspeople from Saratov
Medalists at the 1980 Summer Olympics
Universiade medalists in fencing
Universiade bronze medalists for the Soviet Union
Medalists at the 1973 Summer Universiade
Medalists at the 1977 Summer Universiade